Kleto Gjura (born 30 November 1998) is an Albanian footballer who plays as a defender. He also holds Italian citizenship.

Club career
Gjura made his professional debut in the 2017–18 season of Serie C, on 28 April 2018 against Pistoiese. He came in as a substitute for Dragan Lovrić in the 74th minute. He scored the only goal of Alessandria ten minutes later, but his team lost the match 2–1.

International career 
Gjura made his debut in the Albania national under-19 football team on 4 October 2017, in an 2017 UEFA European Under-19 Championship qualification match against Ukraine, playing 90 minutes.

References

External links
 
 
 
Profile - Alessandria Calcio

1998 births
Living people
Footballers from Shkodër
Albanian footballers
Association football defenders
Albania youth international footballers
Albanian emigrants to Italy
U.S. Alessandria Calcio 1912 players
Albanian expatriate footballers
Albanian expatriate sportspeople in Italy
Expatriate footballers in Italy